Brioschi is the surname of the following people:
 Antonio Brioschi (fl. c.1725–1750), Italian composer, pioneer in symphonic music of the early Classical period
 Francesco Brioschi (1824–1897), Italian mathematician
 Renato Brioschi (born 1948), Italian singer and composer

Brioschi may also refer to:
 Brioschi, Italian medical company
 Brioschi formula, a formula introduced by Francesco Brioschi for Gaussian curvature

Italian-language surnames